Malaspina Inlet is an inlet on the east side of Desolation Sound in the South Coast region of British Columbia, Canada, located between Malaspina and Gifford Peninsulas.  Sidewaters include Thors Cove and, via it, Theodosia Inlet, where the locality of Theodosia Arm is located.  The upper, southeastern, end of Malaspina Inlet near the City of Powell River is called Okeover Inlet. on the east side of which the steamer landing Larsons Landing is located.  Grace Harbour is located on north side of Malaspina Inlet on the southwest side of Gifford Peninsula.

See also
Malaspina (disambiguation)

References

Sunshine Coast (British Columbia)
Inlets of British Columbia